Gandāra, or Gadāra in Achaemenid inscriptions (Old Persian cuneiform: 𐎥𐎭𐎠𐎼, also transliterated as  since the nasal "n" before consonants was omitted in the Old Persian script, and simplified as  or sometimes ) was one of the easternmost provinces of the Achaemenid Empire in South Asia, following the Achaemenid invasion of the Indus Valley. It appears in various Achaemenid inscriptions such as the Behistun Inscription, or the DNa inscription of Darius the Great.

The extent of the province was apparently wider than the actual geographical region of Gandhara.

History

Gandhara before the Achaemenid conquest
During the 6th century BCE, Gandhāra was an important imperial power in north-west Iron Age South Asia, with the other states of the Punjab region, such as the Kekayas, Madrakas, Uśīnaras, and Shivis being under Gāndhārī suzerainty. The Gāndhārī king Pukkusāti, who reigned around 550 BCE, engaged in expansionist ventures which brought him into conflict with the king Pradyota of the rising power of Avanti. Pukkusāti was successful in this struggle with Pradyota, but war broke out between him and the Pāṇḍava tribe located in the Punjab region, and who were threatened by his expansionist policy. Pukkusāti also engaged in friendly relations with the king Bimbisāra of Magadha.

Achaemenid Gandhara

By the later 6th century BCE, the founder of the Persian Achaemenid Empire, Cyrus, soon after his conquests of Media, Lydia, and Babylonia, marched into Gandhara and annexed it into his empire.

The scholar Kaikhosru Danjibuoy Sethna advanced that Cyrus had conquered only the trans-Indus borderlands around Peshawar which had belonged to Gandhāra while Pukkusāti remained a powerful king who maintained his rule over the rest of Gandhāra and the western Punjab. However, according to the scholar Buddha Prakash, Pukkusāti might have acted as a bulwark against the expansion of the Persian Achaemenid Empire into north-west South Asia. This hypothesis posits that the army which Nearchus claimed Cyrus had lost in Gedrosia had in fact been defeated by Pukkusāti's Gāndhārī kingdom. Therefore, following Prakash's position, the Achaemenids would have been able to conquer Gandhāra only after a period of decline of Gandhāra after the reign of Pukkusāti, combined with the growth of Achaemenid power under the kings Cambyses II and Darius I.

However, the presence of Gandhāra, referred to as Gandāra in Old Persian, among the list of Achaemenid provinces in Darius's Behistun Inscription confirms that his empire had inherited this region from conquests carried out earlier by Cyrus, with the annexation under Cyrus being limited to Gandhāra proper, after which the peoples of the Punjab region previously under Gāndhārī authority took advantage of the new power vacuum to form their own small states.

It is unknown whether Pukkusāti remained in power after the Achaemenid conquest as a Persian vassal or if he was replaced by a Persian satrap (governor), although Buddhist sources claim that he renounced his throne and became a monk after becoming a disciple of the Buddha.

Under Persian rule, a system of centralized administration, with a bureaucratic system, was introduced into the Indus Valley for the first time. Provinces or "satrapy" were established with provincial capitals.

Gandhara satrapy, established 518 BCE with its capital at Pushkalavati (Charsadda). Gandhara Satrapy was established in the general region of the old Gandhara grave culture, in what is today Khyber Pakhtunkhwa. During Achaemenid rule, the Kharosthi alphabet, derived from the one used for Aramaic (the official language of Achaemenids), developed here and remained the national script of Gandhara until 200 CE.

The inscription on Darius' (521–486 BC) tomb at Naqsh-i-Rustam near Persepolis records Gadāra (Gandāra) along with Hindush (Hənduš, Sindh) in the list of satrapies. By about 380 BC the Persian hold on the region had weakened. Many small kingdoms sprang up in Gandhara.

Conquest by Alexander

In 327 BCE, Alexander the Great conquered Gandhara as well as the Indian satrapies of the Persian Empire. The expeditions of Alexander were recorded by his court historians and by Arrian (around 175 AD) in his Anabasis Alexandri and by other chroniclers many centuries after the event.

In the winter of 327 BC, Alexander invited all the chieftains in the remaining five Achaemenid satraps to submit to his authority. Ambhi, then ruler of Taxila in the former Hindush satrapy complied, but the remaining tribes and clans in the former satraps of Gandhara, Arachosia, Sattagydia and Gedrosia rejected Alexander's offer.

The first tribe they encountered were the Aspasioi tribe of the Kunar Valley, who initiated a fierce battle against Alexander, in which he himself was wounded in the shoulder by a dart. However, the Aspasioi eventually lost and 40,000 people were enslaved. Alexander then continued in a southwestern direction where he encountered the Assakenoi tribe of the Swat & Buner valleys in April 326 BC. The Assakenoi fought bravely and offered stubborn resistance to Alexander and his army in the cities of Ora, Bazira (Barikot) and Massaga. So enraged was Alexander about the resistance put up by the Assakenoi that he killed the entire population of Massaga and reduced its buildings to rubble. A similar slaughter then followed at Ora, another stronghold of the Assakenoi. The stories of these slaughters reached numerous Assakenians, who began fleeing to Aornos, a hill-fort located between Shangla and Kohistan. Alexander followed close behind their heels and besieged the strategic hill-fort, eventually capturing and destroying the fort and killing everyone inside. The remaining smaller tribes either surrendered or like the Astanenoi tribe of Pushkalavati (Charsadda) were quickly neutralized where 38,000 soldiers and 230,000 oxen were captured by Alexander. Eventually Alexander's smaller force would meet with the larger force which had come through the Khyber Pass met at Attock. With the conquest of Gandhara complete, Alexander switched to strengthening his military supply line, which by now stretched dangerously vulnerable over the Hindu Kush back to Balkh in Bactria.

After conquering Gandhara and solidifying his supply line back to Bactria, Alexander combined his forces with the King Ambhi of Taxila and crossed the River Indus in July 326 BC to begin the Archosia (Punjab) campaign. Alexander nominated officers as Satraps of the new provinces, and in Gandhara, Oxyartes was nominated to the position of Satrap in 326 BC.

Gandarans in Achaemenid Army
According to Herodotus, soldiers of Gandāra participated to the Second Persian invasion of Greece around 480 BC. They had a different equipment from the Hindush, rather akin to that of the Bactrians, and were under the command of Artyphius, son of Artabanus:

The depiction of Indian soldiers and the names of the three Ancient Indian provinces including Gandāra still appear in trilingual cuneiform labels above their respective figures on the tomb of Artaxerxes II (c.358 BC).

See also
India (Herodotus)

Notes

References

Achaemenid satrapies